The Global Partnership on Artificial Intelligence (GPAI, or "gee-pay") is an international and multi-stakeholder initiative that aims to advance the responsible and human-centric development and use of artificial intelligence. Specifically, GPAI brings together leading experts from science, industry, civil society, and governments to "bridge the gap between theory and practice" through applied AI projects and activities. The goal is to facilitate international collaboration, reduce duplication between governments, and act as a global reference point on discussions on responsible AI.

First announced on the margins of the 2018 G7 Summit by Canadian Prime Minister Justin Trudeau and French President Emmanuel Macron, GPAI officially launched on June 15, 2020 with fifteen founding members: Australia, Canada, France, Germany, India, Italy, Japan, Mexico, New Zealand, the Republic of Korea, Singapore, Slovenia, the United Kingdom, the United States and the European Union. The OECD hosts a dedicated secretariat to support GPAI's governing bodies and activities. UNESCO joined the partnership in December 2020 as an observer. On November 11, 2021, Czechia, Israel and few more EU countries also joined the GPAI, bringing the total membership to 25 countries. Since the November 2022 summit, the list of members stands at 29, with in addition to the above, Belgium, Brazil, Denmark, Ireland, The Netherlands, Poland, Senegal, Serbia, Sweden, and Turkey.

GPAI's experts collaborate across several Working Groups themes: Responsible AI (including an ad-hoc subgroup on AI and Pandemic Response), Data Governance, Future of Work, and Innovation & Commercialization. GPAI's Working Groups are supported by two Centres of Expertise: one in Montreal that supports the first two Working Groups, and one in Paris that supports the latter two. It also has a Steering Committee, the elected chair of which has also been to date elected chair of the Multi Stakeholder Group (MEG). These chairs have been:
 Jordan Zed and Baroness Joanna Shields (Shields, MEG chair; 2020-2021),   
 Joanna Shields and Renaud Vedel (Shields, MEG chair; 2021-2022), 
 Yoichi Iida and Inma Martinez (Martinez, MEG chair; 2023-2024)

GPAI has a rotating presidency and host (much like the G7). The presidencies to date have been:
 Canada (2020)
 France
 Japan
 India (2023)

References

External links
 

Artificial intelligence associations
Organizations established in 2020